Mawlawi  (also spelled Maulvi, Molvi, Moulavi and Mawlvi) is an Islamic religious title given to Muslim religious scholars, or ulama, preceding their names, similar to the titles Mawlānā, Mullah, or Sheikh. Mawlawi generally means a highly qualified Islamic scholar, usually one who has completed full studies in a madrassa (Islamic school) or darul uloom (Islamic seminary). It is commonly used in Iran, Central Asia, South Asia, South East Asia and East Africa. The word Mawlawi is derived from the Arabic word mawla, which has several meanings, including "lord".

Turkish Mawlawi fraternity of Sufis (Muslim mystics) was founded in Konya (Qonya), Anatolia, by the Persian Sufi poet Jalal ad-Din ar-Rumi (d. 1273), whose popular title mawlana (Arabic for "our master") gave the order its name. The order, propagated throughout Anatolia, controlled Konya and environs by the 15th century and in the 17th century appeared in Istanbul.

Indian Subcontinent 
Although the words Maulvi, Maulvi and Maulana are interchangeable in the Indian subcontinent as a title of respect, Maulana is more often associated with formal qualification following study at a madrasa or darul uloom whereas Maulvi is usually more a general title for religious figures.

In the Pakistani and Central Asian context, where Mullah does not carry a formal meaning, "Maulana" or "Maulvi" is often the word of choice for addressing or referring to respected Muslim religious scholars (ulama).

Bangladesh 
In Bangladesh, in the government Aliyah Madrasa system, Maulvi/Moulvi is also associated with formal degrees for those who have passed the course of Maulvi (basic), Maulvi Aalim  (intermediate) or Maulvi Fazil (advanced).

See also
 Maulvi family, a prominent Bengali Muslim family
 Glossary of Islam
 Hadrat

References 

Religious leadership roles
Islamic honorifics
Islamic Persian honorifics
Islamic Urdu honorifics